There have been two baronetcies created for persons with the surname Roche, once in the baronetage of Ireland and once in the baronetage of the United Kingdom. One creation is extant as of 2010.

The Roche Baronetcy, of Fermoy in the County of Cork, was created on 30 November 1782 for the soldier and politician Sir Boyle Roche. He was childless and the title became extinct on his death in 1807.

The Roche Baronetcy, of Carass in Limerick, was created in the baronetage of the United Kingdom on 8 August 1838 for David Roche, Member of Parliament for Limerick. The second baronet was vice-lieutenant and high sheriff of County Limerick. The third baronet was a deputy lieutenant of County Carlow. The fourth baronet was a naval commander.

Roche baronets, of Fermoy (1782)
Sir Boyle Roche, 1st Baronet (1736–1807)

Roche baronets, of Carass (1838)
Sir David Roche, 1st Baronet (1791–1865)
Sir David Vandeleur Roche, 2nd Baronet (1833–1908)
Sir Standish Roche, 3rd Baronet (1845–1914)
Sir Standish O'Grady Roche, DSO, 4th Baronet (1911–1977)
Sir David O'Grady Roche, 5th Baronet (born 21 September 1947).  He is Deputy Chairman of the Standing Council of the Baronetage. In 2008, Roche lived at Bridge House, Starbotton, Skipton, Yorkshire, England. The heir apparent to the baronetcy is David Alexander O'Grady Roche (born 1976), youngest, but only surviving son of the Sir David and Alexandra Roche, Lady Roche.

Notes

References
Kidd, Charles, Williamson, David (editors). Debrett's Peerage and Baronetage (1990 edition). New York: St Martin's Press, 1990, 

Baronetcies in the Baronetage of the United Kingdom
Extinct baronetcies in the Baronetage of Ireland